Mirbek Akhmataliyevich Akhmataliyev (born 7 February 1994 in Orozbekov) is a Kyrgyz footballer who plays for PDRM of the Malaysia Premier League, and the Kyrgyzstan national team.

Club career
Akhmataliyev signed for FC Dordoi Bishkek for the 2016 season after previously impressing with the club's youth sides and as a top scorer in the league for Dinamo Bishkek and Alga Bishkek. Following the season he competed with the club in 2017 AFC Cup and scored against Benfica de Macau in the qualifying round.

The following season he transferred to Tatvan Gençlerbirliği Spor of the Turkish Regional Amateur League. For the next season he moved to Kale Belediyespor of the same league.

He split the 2021 Kyrgyz Premier League season between Kaganat and Abdysh-Ata Kant. In total he scored nineteen goals in 28 matches to win the scoring title and helping Abdysh-Ata Kant finish second in the table. Following the season he signed for PDRM of the Malaysia Premier League. During pre-season, he score three goals in three matches including against Kedah Darul Aman, Sri Pahang, and Selegor 2. He became captain of the squad shortly after signing.

International career
Akhmataliyev made his senior international debut on 11 October 2016 in a friendly against Turkmenistan.

International career statistics

References

External links
National Football Teams profile
Soccerway profile

1994 births
Living people
Kyrgyzstani footballers
Kyrgyzstan international footballers
Association football forwards
FC Dordoi Bishkek players